Brainworks Kids creative learning was established in May 2008 by Better Value brand. It started with 14 company owned outlets in Western India when Brainworks launched its franchising drive in October 2008. It has a playschool, nursery, KG, day care and hobby classes for children.

Programmes 
The Brainworks LDP (Learning Development Program) consists of the ‘windows of opportunity’ that maximizes development through a scientific curriculum for Preschool, structured learning daycare and curriculum based creative learning for hobby classes.

Curriculum 
Brainwork has designed its curriculum and methodology based on scientific brain research studies. Brainworks preschools provide a research driven teaching and learning environment for children between 0 and 6 years of age.

Facilities 
Brainworks schools are located in residential locations. This area includes at least four classrooms, a play area, a pantry, storage spaces, and child-friendly washrooms. All washrooms are self-contained within the classroom or within the school complex.

Partnerships 
Brainwork is an initiative of Popular Prakashan to reach the mass audience. The parent company Better Value Brands Pvt. Ltd. consists of group firms including Talwalkars, Popular Prakashan, Better Value Restaurants, Lateral Heights and Naturals Ice cream.

References

External links 
 Brainworks Learning Systems Web Page
 List of Brainworks schools in India

Educational institutions established in 2008
Educational organisations based in India
2008 establishments in India